Ale Yarok, is a liberal political party in Israel best known for its ideology of legalizing cannabis. To date, it has had no representation in the Knesset. Ale Yarok has not yet met the electoral threshold for inclusion in any of the elections that they have contested.

History
Established in 1999 by Boaz Wachtel, Shlomi Sandak, and Rafik Kimchi, the party gained 1% of the vote in the elections that year, and 1.2% in the 2003 elections, but both times failed to pass the 1.5% threshold for representation in the Knesset. After these elections and despite the strong results in the 2003 elections, the chairman of Ale Yarok, Boaz Wachtel announced that he was giving up the leadership of the party, but remained in the position due to party members requests.

Before the 2006 elections the party announced that it intended to run for a third time, despite the threshold for representation having been raised to 2%. The party competed for votes with the supporters of the Democratic Choice (which later stepped down from running in the election) and with Meretz-Yachad, which had also promised to act for the decriminalization of soft drugs; another competitor was the Green Party with a strong ecological platform. The party gained 1.3% of the vote, and came second among those parties failing to make the threshold. After the election, Wachtel passed the chairmanship to Ohad Shem-Tov.

Before the 2009 elections, Shem-Tov was expelled from the party by Shlomi Sandak who was the temporary chairman of the Green Leaf Party. Internal disputes led the party to split with Shem-Tov forming the Ale Yarok Alumni group. The Alumni party later allied with the Holocaust Survivors party to contest the 2009 Knesset elections. In this elections Ale Yarok was led by the Israeli Comedian Gil Kopatch.

For the 2013 elections, it ran with some members of the "New Liberal Movement" (an Israeli libertarian nonpartisan organization, also known as the Israeli Freedom Movement). under the name "Ale Yarok-The Liberal list". In these elections the party presented a broad liberal platform.

Since December 2014, Oren Lebovitch is the chairman of the party. Lebovitch, the editor-in-chief of the Israeli Cannabis Magazine, lead the party to its highest number of voters on the March 2015 election.

Ideology
The party's current platform is based on the legalization of the cannabis plant, marijuana and hashish, expansion of human rights, free market and institutionalization of prostitution and gambling. In official publications the movement claims that "the partition between right-wing and left-wing is anachronistic"; it believes that any proposed solution of the Israeli-Palestinian conflict must be put on referendum in order to be legitimate. It takes a left-wing stance on the Israeli–Palestinian conflict.

Election results

See also
Cannabis in Israel
Cannabis: Legal issues
Drug liberalization
Drug policy reform
Marijuana parties
Politics of Israel

References

External links
 

1999 establishments in Israel
Cannabis political parties
Cannabis political parties of Israel
Green liberalism
Green political parties in Israel
Liberal parties in Israel
Political parties established in 1999
Political parties in Israel
1999 in cannabis